Cold Spring, Cold Springs, Coldspring, or Coldsprings may refer to:

Places

Canada
 Cold Springs, Manitoulin District, Ontario
 Cold Springs, Northumberland County, Ontario
 Coldspring House, British Columbia, Canada (also known as Coldspring)

United States
 Cold Spring (Waldron, Arkansas), listed on the NRHP in Arkansas
 Cold Spring, former name of Cold Springs, El Dorado County, California
 Cold Spring Canyon Arch Bridge, California
 Cold Spring, Kentucky
 Cold Spring, Minnesota
 Cold Spring, New Jersey
 Cold Spring Grange Hall, listed on the NRHP in Cape May County, New Jersey 
 Cold Spring Presbyterian Church, listed on the NRHP in Cape May County, New Jersey 
 Historic Cold Spring Village
 Cold Spring, New York
 Cold Spring (Metro-North station)
 Cold Spring, Tennessee
 Cold Spring, Wisconsin, a town 
 Cold Spring (community), Wisconsin, an unincorporated community
 Cold Spring (Shepherdstown, West Virginia), a house listed on the National Register of Historic Places
 Cold Springs, El Dorado County, California
 Cold Springs, Tuolumne County, California
 Cold Springs, Indiana
 Cold Springs, Washoe County, Nevada
 Cold Springs, Buffalo, a neighborhood in Buffalo, New York
 Cold Springs Station Site in Lander County, Nevada
 Cold Springs Rancheria of Mono Indians of California in Fresno County, California
 Coldspring, New York
 Coldspring, Texas
 Coldsprings Township, Michigan

Taiwan
 Su'ao Cold Spring

Schools
 Cold Springs High School in Bremen, Alabama
 Cold Springs Middle School, in the Washoe County School District in Washoe County, Nevada

Other uses
 Cold Spring (label), an independent record label based in Northamptonshire, England
 Coldspring (company), a United States quarrier, fabricator, and manufacturer (formerly known as Cold Spring Granite)
 ColdSpring Framework, an object-oriented framework for ColdFusion programming
 Cold Springs Pegram Truss Railroad Bridge in Blaine County, Idaho
 Cold Springs Cemetery in the town of Lockport, New York

See also
 Cold Spring Farm (disambiguation)
 Cold Spring Harbor (disambiguation)